Ignacio Goldstein (21 January 1924 – 30 July 2001) was a Chilean fencer. He competed in the individual sabre and épée events at the 1948 Summer Olympics.

References

External links
 

1924 births
2001 deaths
Chilean male épée fencers
Olympic fencers of Chile
Fencers at the 1948 Summer Olympics
Chilean male sabre fencers
20th-century Chilean people